Taygetis laches is a species of butterfly of the family Nymphalidae. It is found from Mexico to northern Argentina.

The larvae feed on Olyra, Acroceras and Panicum species.

Subspecies
Taygetis laches laches (Guyana, Suriname)
Taygetis laches marginata Staudinger, [1887] (Brazil: São Paulo)
Taygetis laches isis Bargmann, 1928

References

Butterflies described in 1793
Euptychiina
Butterflies of North America
Nymphalidae of South America
Fauna of Brazil
Taxa named by Johan Christian Fabricius